Alexander Ryabov (born 5 February 1979) is a Russian former professional ice hockey player. He was a long-time member with CSK VVS Samara in the Russian leagues.

References

1979 births
Living people
Russian ice hockey forwards
Sportspeople from Samara, Russia